CCTV-16 is a Chinese free-to-air television channel, owned by China Central Television. The channel is a localised version of the Olympic Channel, broadcasting primarily in 4K UHD format, with a downscaled feed for HDTV.

History and programming 
In January 2019, Voice of China announced plans to launch a Chinese version of the Olympic Channel. The channel later launched on 25 October 2021, prior to the 2022 Winter Olympics. Like its numerous localisations, the Chinese version of the Olympic Channel airs both live and classic sports events, along with original programming.

References 

China Central Television channels
Television channels and stations established in 2021
2021 establishments in China
Olympics on television